The Social Credit Party of Canada, colloquially known as the Socreds, was a populist political party in Canada that promoted social credit theories of monetary reform. It was the federal wing of the Canadian social credit movement.

Origins and founding: 1932–1963 
The Canadian social credit movement was largely an out-growth of the Alberta Social Credit Party, and the Social Credit Party of Canada was strongest in Alberta during this period. In 1932, Baptist evangelist William Aberhart used his radio program to preach the values of social credit throughout the province. He added a heavy dose of fundamentalist Christianity to C. H. Douglas' monetary theories; as a result, the social credit movement in Canada has had a strong social conservative tint.

The party was formed in 1935 as the Western Social Credit League. It attracted voters from the Progressive Party of Canada and the United Farmers movement. The party grew out of disaffection with the status quo during the Great Depression, which hit the party's western Canadian birthplace especially hard. It can be credited both for the creation of this party and the rise of the social democratic Co-operative Commonwealth Federation, forerunner of today's New Democratic Party.

In the party's first federal election in 1935, it only ran candidates in Western Canada. It won 17 seats, of which 15 were in Alberta and where it won over 46% of that province's popular vote. John Horne Blackmore was chosen as the party's parliamentary leader.

In 1939, Social Credit merged with the New Democracy movement led by former Conservative William Duncan Herridge. However, Herridge failed to win a seat in the 1940 election, and Blackmore continued as parliamentary leader. At the party's first national convention in 1944, delegates decided to abandon the name New Democracy and founded the Social Credit Association of Canada as a national party. They chose Alberta Treasurer Solon Earl Low as the party's first national leader.

In its early years, the Socreds gained a reputation for Antisemitism. It was said that Blackmore and Low "frequently gave public aid and comfort to anti-Semitism" In 1945, Solon Low alleged there was a conspiracy of Jewish bankers behind the world's problems, and in 1947, Norman Jaques, the Socred Member of Parliament for Wetaskiwin, read excerpts of The Protocols of the Elders of Zion into the parliamentary Hansard. Low repudiated anti-Semitism in 1957 following a trip to Israel after which he made speeches supporting the Jewish state. After World War II made anti-Semitism intolerable, the party began purging itself of anti-Semitic influences, leading Quebec social crediter Louis Even and his followers to leave the party in 1947.

In 1957, Low led the party to its best performance so far, with 19 seats. However, in 1958, the Socreds were swept out of the Commons altogether as part of that year's massive Progressive Conservative landslide. Although it was not apparent at the time, this began a long-term decline for the party. For most of its first quarter-century of existence, Social Credit had been either the first or second party in much of rural western Canada, particularly in its birthplace of rural Alberta. In 1957, for instance, it took 13 of Alberta's 17 seats. However, the 1958 defeat firmly established the Tories as the main right-of-centre party west of Ontario, and Social Credit would never seriously challenge the Tories there again.

Provincial social credit movements

Alberta 
Aberhart received a positive response from Albertans to his social credit philosophies. In 1935, much to its own surprise, the Alberta Social Credit Party won the 1935 provincial election, forming the first Social Credit government in the world. It went on to win nine subsequent elections, and governed until 1971.

Quebec 
In the 1940s Social Credit supporters in Quebec often ran under the name Union des électeurs. This was a social credit organization that was formed in 1939 by Louis Even and Gilberte Côté-Mercier as the political arm of their religious organization, the Pilgrims of Saint Michael. They shared some ideologies, but did not merge or collaborate with the western-based national party and had an inconsistent attitude towards electoral politics. The Union des électeurs' electoral philosophy was that it was not a partisan political party but an organization to marshal voters to enforce their wishes on their elected representatives. Even believed party politics was corrupt and that the party system should be abolished and replaced by a "union of electors" who would compel elected officials to follow the popular will. The Union also favoured a more orthodox application of social credit economic theory, something that the western based Social Credit movement had begun to move away from under the influence of Alberta premier Ernest Manning. This led to tensions with the national party and Even initially opposed the creation of a national Social Credit Party.

Réal Caouette, a member of the Union des électeurs, won a 1946 by-election as a Social Credit MP and ran, unsuccessfully, for re-election as a Union des électeurs candidate in the 1949 federal election. In 1958, Caouette disagreed with Even, Côté-Mercier and the increasingly hostile attitude of the Union des électeurs towards elections and party politics. He founded the Ralliement des créditistes which won recognition as the Quebec wing of the national Social Credit party.

Ontario 
The Union des électeurs philosophy inspired an Ontario group, the Union of Electors led by Ron Gostick, to form in 1946 as a rival to the Ontario Social Credit League. It first ran candidates in the 1948 provincial election under the "Union of Electors" label. Even's views also led to a debate within the national Social Credit Party about whether to continue to run on a Social Credit basis or under the "non-partisan" Union of Electors banner.

British Columbia 
In British Columbia, the movement split: both the British Columbia Social Credit League and the Union of Electors ran candidates in the 1949 provincial election. In the 1952 provincial election the Social Credit party under W. A. C. Bennett won a plurality of seats (defeating the Co-operative Commonwealth Federation by one seat) in the election. The Socreds won a majority government in 1953, and Bennett governed the province until his loss in the 1972 provincial election. The party won the subsequent 1975 provincial election and governed until 1991.

Saskatchewan and Manitoba 
The provincial social credit parties of Saskatchewan and Manitoba won some ridings in the 1950s and 1960s. However, they were unable to form a government.

Split between Quebec and English Canadian factions: 1963–1973 

In the early 1960s there were serious tensions between the party's English and French wings. In 1961, Robert Thompson of Alberta defeated Caouette at the party's leadership convention. The vote totals were never announced. Years later, Caouette claimed that he would have won, but Manning advised him to tell the Quebec delegates to vote for Thompson because the West would never accept a Francophone Catholic as party leader.

The party returned to Parliament in the 1962 election, electing 30 members, its highest-ever seat total. Caouette and 25 other créditistes were elected from Quebec. However, it only elected four MPs from the rest of Canada, including Thompson in Red Deer, Alberta. This began a gradual shift in the federal party's strength from Western Canada to Quebec.

Under the circumstances, Thompson had no choice but to name Caouette the party's deputy leader. The linguistic imbalance caused tension in the Social Credit caucus, as the Quebec MPs regarded Caouette as their leader. Also, Caouette and the other Quebec MPs remained true believers in social credit theory while the English branch had largely abandoned it. Thompson refused to resign as party leader and the party voted in 1963 for a motion of non-confidence against the government of John Diefenbaker, forcing an election. The Socreds won 24 seats, all but four coming from Quebec.

On September 9, 1963, the party split into an English Canadian wing and a separate French Canadian party led by Caouette called the Ralliement des créditistes. Of the 20 Social Credit MPs from Quebec in 1963, 13 joined Caouette's Ralliement. Of the remaining seven, two ran in the next election as independents, and two joined the Progressive Conservatives.

Decline of the party in English Canada 
The English Canadian party, concentrated in Alberta and British Columbia, won only five seats in the 1965 federal election. Thompson was frustrated by the lack of support given to the federal wing, while the provincial parties in Alberta and British Columbia won provincial elections with large majorities. British Columbia's Socred Premier, W. A. C. Bennett cut off his party's organizational and financial support after the 1965 election in hopes of pressuring the federal party to reconcile with Caouette's Créditistes.

Alberta Premier Manning was becoming concerned with the perceived leftward trajectory of the federal Liberals and Progressive Conservatives (PCs). He encouraged Thompson to begin talks with the PCs about a merger. Negotiations failed and in March 1967, citing lack of support for the party from its provincial wings in Alberta and British Columbia, Thompson resigned as leader. In the fall Bud Olson left to join the Liberals. With the support of both Manning and PC leader Robert Stanfield, Thompson crossed the floor to the PCs. He sought and won the PC nomination in Red Deer when the June 1968 federal election was called. Alexander Bell Patterson was named acting leader of the remains.

In the 1968 election, Social Credit lost its remaining three seats. This was due to its internal turmoil, Manning's call to merge with the PCs, the defections of Thompson and Olson, and the wave of Trudeaumania across Canada. National party president Herb Bruch said Patterson's refusal to take a clear stand on whether the Socreds would support Robert Stanfield’s PCs in Parliament was a contributing factor in the party's defeat. Patterson expressed confidence that the party could return as it had after the Diefenbaker sweep in the 1958 election, noting the strength of the Créditistes in Quebec, and expressed hope that the two parties would be reunited. However, the party would never win another seat in English Canada.

Reunification 

In 1971, the Ralliement des créditistes and the English Canadian Social Credit Party held a joint leadership convention at the Hull Arena. The two parties merged into a single national party under the Social Credit name, and Caouette won the leadership on the first ballot.

In the 1972 election, the Social Credit Party won 15 seats—all in Quebec—and 7.6% of the popular vote. Manning was appointed to the Senate of Canada in 1970—the first and (as it turned out) only Socred ever to serve in that body. Patterson returned to Parliament as a Progressive Conservative in the 1972 election.

Decline: 1973–1980 
Despite a modest success in the 1970 Quebec election, the provincial wing of the party was wracked continually by internal divisions, eventually splitting into two factions, one led by Camil Samson and the other by Armand Bois. On February 4, 1973, former federal Liberal cabinet minister Yvon Dupuis was elected leader of the Ralliement créditiste du Québec, but failed to win his riding of Saint-Jean in the 1973 provincial election, and the party only retained two of their 12 seats. Under pressure and without a seat, Dupuis resigned the leadership on May 5, 1974.

In the 1974 federal election, the Social Credit Party machine in Quebec began to fall apart. Caouette was recovering from a snowmobiling accident and was unable to actively lead the party. When he was able to speak, Caouette focused his campaign on the Tories and the New Democratic Party instead of the Liberals, even though the Liberals were Social Credit's main competitor in Quebec. Two weeks before the election was called, Caouette had informed the parliamentary caucus that he would resign as leader in the fall.

Party rallies faced declining, aging audiences. Feuding within the party had accelerated and some ridings in Quebec had two Social Credit candidates, while others — including the party's Lévis stronghold — had none. Many Social Credit MPs ran for re-election on their own strengths, making little mention of the party or its leader in their campaign materials. The party's support in Quebec was undermined by rumours that its MPs had made deals with the Progressive Conservatives during Caouette's illness.

The Socreds won 11 seats, which was considered a success in light of the divisions that plagued their campaign, but was one short of the 12 seats needed for official party status in the House of Commons. The Socreds failed in their attempts to convince Independent MP Leonard Jones to join their party and the Socreds made attempts to get recognition as an official party. The Speaker of the House of Commons, with approval from the Liberal government, decided to recognize the party.

Leadership turmoil 
The decline of the party accelerated after Caouette resigned from the party leadership in 1976. He was hospitalized after a stroke on September 16, and died later that year. The party held its leadership convention November 6–7, 1976 at the Civic Centre in Ottawa. This time, 85% of the delegates were from Quebec.

André-Gilles Fortin, the 32-year-old MP for Lotbinière won the convention on the second ballot. Fortin presented a young, dynamic image, but campaigned on traditional social credit economic theory and supporting small business. Fortin was killed in a car accident on June 24, 1977, after serving only eight months as leader. Réal's son, Gilles Caouette, was named acting leader five days after Fortin's death.

In 1978, Socreds elected Lorne Reznowski as their leader, in an attempt to revive the party outside of Quebec. Reznowski, an anglophone Manitoban, presented himself as a candidate in the October 16, 1978, by-elections and fared extremely poorly with 2.76% of votes in the riding of Saint Boniface. He resigned quickly thereafter and replaced as acting leader by Charles-Arthur Gauthier.

Roy's leadership 
Popular provincial  Fabien Roy was selected to lead Social Credit just before the 1979 election. Under Roy, the party won the tacit support of the separatist Parti Québécois, which had become the government of Quebec three years earlier. The party focused its platform on constitutional change, promising to fight to abolish the federal government's never-used right to disallow any provincial legislation, and stating that each province has a "right to choose its own destiny within Canada".

Gilles Caouette publicly denounced what he called  ('PQ supporters disguised as Socreds'). Caouette had said that he wanted to work within the spirit and letter of Confederation, stating, "Let us not burn our bridges. It is not the time for the Ralliement des créditistes to be separatists, but rather to win recognition for the French fact within Canada." Caouette said that he would fight for the recognition of French Canada's aspirations within Confederation on the basis of a partnership with the other nine provinces, "but if this partnership cannot be brought about, I shall become the more ardent separatist in Quebec."

The party increased its vote in areas where the PQ was popular, but lost support in areas of traditional Socred strength. This resulted in the Socred caucus being cut in half, from eleven seats to six, and a slightly reduced share of the popular vote compared to the 1974 election.

Clark minority government 
Joe Clark's Progressive Conservatives formed a minority government after the 1979 federal election. The Socreds had just enough seats to give the Tories a majority in the House of Commons. However, Clark declared that he would govern as if he had a majority and refused to grant the small Social Credit caucus the official party status it wanted or make concessions to the party in order to gain its votes. Clark convinced one Socred MP, Richard Janelle from Lotbinière, to cross the floor and join the government caucus. In December 1979, the remaining five members of the Social Credit caucus demanded that the Conservatives amend their budget to allocate the controversial gas tax revenues to Quebec. Clark refused and the Socreds abstained in a vote on a motion of non-confidence, which, along with several Conservative party members not being able to attend the vote, caused the government to fall.

While Roy cited a prior precedent in then-leader Réal Caouette having the party abstain in a motion of non-confidence in the government of Lester B. Pearson in 1968, his doing the same would prove to be a disastrous and, ultimately, fatal miscalculation. Whereas the make-up of the 1968 parliament had been such that the motion of non-confidence in Pearson had little realistic chance of succeeding (and Caouette's abstention definitively ended any chance of it doing so), the margins in the 1979 parliament were sufficiently tight that, had the Socreds supported the government and even one of the absent Progressive Conservative MPs been present, the motion of non-confidence would have tied on votes and, according to tradition, been defeated by the speaker's casting vote. Moreover, both of the party's major bases of support were alienated by the abstention, with the Quebec nationalist faction seeing Socreds as being ineffective at representing the province's interests, and the social conservative faction being enraged that the party had effectively offered former prime minister Pierre Trudeau, who had intended to resign as Liberal Party leader until Clark's government fell, a route back into power. In the 1980 election the Socreds' popular vote fell to 1.7 percent, and it lost its remaining seats.

The death of the Social Credit candidate in the riding of Frontenac, Quebec, resulted in the postponement of the election in that riding to March 24, 1980. Fabien Roy sought to return to the House of Commons in that by-election, but lost to the Liberal candidate. Roy resigned as leader on November 1, 1980. The party would never again win a seat in the House of Commons, or even come close to doing so.

Denouement: 1981–1993 
After Fabien Roy's resignation, the party chose Martin Hattersley in 1981 as interim leader over Alberta evangelist Ken Sweigard. Hattersley was an Edmonton lawyer and former British army officer.

In the May 4, 1981, by-election in Levis, Quebec, the party nominated Martin Caya. Caya placed 6th in a field of seven candidates, winning 367 votes (1.1% of the total), ahead of renegade Socred John Turmel. In the August 17, 1981, by-election in Quebec, party president Carl O’Malley placed 5th in a field of eight candidates, with 92 votes (0.2% of the total). Turmel won 42 votes, placing last.

Hattersley resigned in 1983 when the party overturned his decision to expel Jim Keegstra and two other Albertans accused of anti-Semitism from the party.

In June 1983, Sweigard was elected interim leader by means of a telephone conference call of 19 party executive members, with nine votes to five votes for party vice-president Richard Lawrence. Quebec party member Adrien Lambert was nominated, but could not be reached by telephone. He nonetheless won two votes.

When the call began, two candidates were in the race: professional gambler John Turmel of Ottawa, and tractor dealer Elmer Knutson of Edmonton, the founder of West-Fed, a western Canada separatist movement.

Turmel's candidacy was rejected on the basis that his membership had been suspended. Turmel formed the Christian Credit Party, and later, the Abolitionist Party of Canada, both based on social credit principles. Knutson failed to win endorsement because he was not well known by the members of the executive. Knutson quit the party to form the Confederation of Regions Party.

The meeting decided to appoint an interim leader until a leadership convention could be held in September 1983. This convention was deferred until June 1986, and Sweigard remained as interim leader until that time. Also in 1983, Manning retired from the Senate after reaching the mandatory retirement age of 75, ending Social Credit's representation on Parliament Hill.

In the 1984 election, the party nominated 52 candidates in 51 ridings, the second-fewest that it had ever run since it began nominating candidates east of Manitoba. None of those candidates even came close to being elected, and the party collected a total of 17,044 votes (0.13% of votes cast in all ridings), losing over 92 percent of its 1980 vote and dropping from fourth place to ninth place. Two candidates ran as Social Credit candidates in the BC riding of Prince George-Peace River. The party's strength remained in Quebec and Alberta, but also ran candidates in British Columbia, Saskatchewan, Ontario and New Brunswick. For all intents and purposes, this was the end of Social Credit as a viable party.

Sweigard resigned as leader in 1986. The party's leadership was won by the socially conservative Ontario evangelical minister Harvey Lainson, who defeated Holocaust denier James Keegstra by 67 votes to 38 at a delegated convention in Toronto. Lainson's campaign focused on gun rights and an opposition to abortion and the metric system. (He was not affiliated with the anti-Semitic groups that endorsed Keegstra.)

In July 1987, the party's national executive ousted Lainson over his call to rename the party the Christian Freedom Party of Canada and Keegstra was appointed acting leader. Lainson, however, refused to relinquish the leadership and Keegstra was expelled from the Social Credit Party and its successor the Christian Freedom Social Credit Party in September. The party was still listed with Elections Canada as the Social Credit Party.

The party nominated Andrew Varaday as its candidate in the 1987 Hamilton Mountain by-election. He won 149 votes (0.4% of the total), placing last in a field of six candidates, which included John Turmel (166 votes).

In the 1988 election, what remained of the party nominated nine candidates: six in Quebec, two in Ontario, and one in British Columbia. These candidates collected a total of 3,408 votes (0.02% of votes cast in all ridings). The British Columbia candidate, running in New Westminster—Burnaby, won 718 votes (1.3% of the total). Although the party came far short of nominating the 50 candidates required for official status, the Chief Electoral Officer agreed to put the party's name on the ballots for the nine candidates on the basis of its half-century historical status as an official party.

Lainson resigned as leader in 1990, and another social conservative evangelist, Ken Campbell, took over the party. He continued to describe the party as the Christian Freedom Party in public appearances, although he also retained the "Social Credit" name on official documents for tax purposes. Under Campbell, the party began moving back toward traditional social credit theory.

The party nominated two candidates in by-elections, each of whom won 96 votes. In the February 12 by-election in Chambly, Quebec, Emilian Martel placed last in a field of six, winning 0.2% of the total vote. Party leader Ken Campbell placed 7th out of 10, winning 0.4% of the total vote in the August 13 by-election in Oshawa, Ontario. John Turmel placed last with 50 votes in this race.

After changes to election law required a party to nominate at least 50 candidates in order to keep its registration and assets, Campbell scrambled to nominate at least that number for the 1993 election so he could relaunch the party under the Christian Freedom name. However, it was only able to nominate ten candidates and was deregistered by Elections Canada on September 27, 1993. Its candidates in that election appeared on the ballot as non-affiliated candidates. Campbell later ran as an unofficial "Christian Freedom Party" candidate in a 1996 by-election in Hamilton East, appearing on the ballot as an independent.

Social Credit has never made another attempt to run candidates again. However, it continued to exist as an incorporated non-profit entity, the "Social Credit Party of Canada, Incorporated." Until his death in 2006, Campbell used it to published political advocacy material in order to preserve his ministry's status as a religious charity.

Election results (1935–1988) 
(These results include New Democracy candidates in the 1940 election but does not include those for Union des électeurs, Independent Social Credit candidates, or the Ralliement des créditistes.)

* In the 1940 election, former Canadian ambassador to the US W. D. Herridge led a group of 17 candidates (including some Social Credit incumbents such as party leader Blackmore and prominent social crediters such as Louis Even) as members of a monetary reform party called New Democracy, which was endorsed by the Social Credit movement. New Democracy ran 17 candidates, received 73,083 votes (1.59%), and won 3 seats (Robert Fair, Walter Frederick Kuhl, and Blackmore – all of whom were incumbent Social Credit MPs running for re-election as New Democracy candidates). Nine seats were contested by candidates who ran under the Social Credit banner – they received 46,271 votes (1%), and 7 of them were elected.  Herridge failed to win a seat in Parliament and the 3 New Democracy MPs joined the 7-member Social Credit MPs the House of Commons, under Blackmore's leadership, with a caucus seat total of 10 members. After the election, the combined caucus was known as New Democracy; the party's national convention in 1944 voted to revert to the name Social Credit.

** In the 1965 and 1968 elections, Quebec social crediters ran separately as the Ralliement des créditistes winning nine and fifteen seats, respectively.

*** The Quebec-based Ralliement des créditistes, which had won 14 seats in 1968 and was the 4th place party, reunited with the national Social Credit party, essentially taking it over. All seats won by the party in 1972 and subsequently were in Quebec. When the 1972 results are compared to the Railliement's 1968 results there is only a gain of 1 seat and an increase in the popular vote of 2.27 percentage points and no change in place.

Attempted revival 
From 2006 to 2009 Wayne Cook, a father's rights activist from Toronto and candidate in 2000 for the Canadian Action Party, attempted to revive the national Social Credit Party of Canada/Parti Credit Social du Canada. His attempt failed to win sufficient support to enable his group to become a registered political party with Elections Canada and the group did not run candidates in the 2008 federal election on either an official or unofficial basis. In June 2009, he announced that his unregistered Social Credit Party of Canada would fold and urged all members to join with the Christian Heritage Party of Canada.

Since the demise of the federal party, several small fringe parties have attempted to promote social credit economic policy while not advocating the social conservativism that the Social Credit Party was known for. John Turmel, who is in the Guinness Book of Records for the most elections contested and for the most elections lost, is an advocate of social credit monetary theory and founded the Abolitionist Party of Canada which ran 80 candidates in the 1993 federal election on a social credit style economic platform. The party was dissolved in 1996. (Turmel also founded the short-lived Christian Credit Party in the early 1980s after he was expelled from the Social Credit Party.)

The Canada Party, founded by former Social Credit candidate Joseph Thauberger, also ran candidates in the 1993 election on a platform of monetary reform influenced by social credit. Many of its members also belonged to the social credit influenced Committee on Monetary and Economic Reform (COMER). In 1997, the Canada Party merged with the left economic nationalist Canadian Action Party which, while not a social credit party per se, adopted a monetary reform policy that is heavily influenced by COMER and the Canada Party.

Leaders 

John Horne Blackmore, MP (1935–1944) parliamentary leader
Solon Earl Low, MP (1944–1961)
Robert Thompson, MP (1961–1967)
Alexander Bell Patterson, MP (1967–1968) acting leader
Réal Caouette, MP (1971–1976)
André-Gilles Fortin, MP (1976–1977)
Gilles Caouette, MP (1977–1978) acting leader
Charles-Arthur Gauthier, MP (1978) acting leader
Lorne Reznowski (1978–1979)
Charles-Arthur Gauthier, MP (1979) acting leader
Fabien Roy, MP (1979–1980)
Martin Hattersley (1981–1983)
Ken Sweigard (1983–1986) acting leader
Harvey Lainson (1986–1990)
Jim Keegstra acting leader (July 27–28, 1987)
Ken Campbell (1990–1993)

Source:Parliament of Canada website: Party File: Social Credit Party

See also 

Canadian social credit movement
Ralliement créditiste
List of Social Credit/Créditistes MPs
Social Credit Party of Alberta
Social Credit Party of British Columbia
Ralliement créditiste du Québec
Manitoba Social Credit Party
Social Credit Party of Saskatchewan
Social Credit Party of Ontario

Footnotes 

1935 establishments in Canada
1993 disestablishments in Canada
Defunct political parties in Canada
Federal political parties in Canada
Political parties disestablished in 1993
Political parties established in 1935
Social credit parties in Canada